The Islamia University of Bahawalpur (IUB), formerly known as Jamia Abbasia, is a public university located in Bahawalpur, Punjab, Pakistan. It is the only government university of the division, which gives standard education in practical as well as in theoretical sense.

History 
Islamia University began as Jamia Abbasia, a religious university established in Bahawalpur in 1925  following the academic pursuits of Al-Azhar University in Egypt. In 1975, Jamia Abbasia was declared a general university and renamed as The Islamia University of Bahawalpur.

Overview
The university started at the Abbasia and Khawaja Fareed campuses with ten departments. Later, 1280 acres of land was allotted to the university on Hasilpur Road about eight kilometers away from the city centre which became the Baghdad-ul-Jadeed campus. It consists 126 teaching departments offering 300  disciplines. In 2015, it was ranked 11th in the general (large) category of universities.

Faculties
The Islamia University Bahawalpur has currently fifteen functional faculties  which are listed as, 

 Faculty of Law
 Faculty of Education
 Faculty of Chemical & Biological Sciences
 Faculty of Physical & Mathematical Sciences
 Faculty of Management Sciences and Commerce
 Faculty of Computing
 Faculty of Social sciences
 Faculty of Pharmacy
 Faculty of Islamic Learning
 Faculty of Arts and Languages
 Faculty of Engineering
 Faculty of Veterinary and Animal Sciences
 Faculty of Agriculture and Environment
 Faculty of Medicine and Allied Health Sciences
 Faculty of Online and Distance Education

Sub campuses
Islamia University added two more campuses in 2005: One covering eastern side of Bahawalpur Division (in Bahawalnagar; known as IUB Bahawalnagar Campus) and the other one to cover western side of Bahawalpur Division (in Rahim Yar Khan; known as IUB - Rahim Yar Khan Campus or IUB - RYK Campus).

List of Vice-Chancellors of The Islamia University of Bahawalpur

Notable alumni 
 Allah Wasaya, Pakistani Islamic scholar
 Shahid Hussain Bhatti, Pakistani politician
 Javed Chaudhry, Pakistani journalist
 Syed Ghulam Moinuddin Gilani, Islamic leader
 Muhammad Afzal Gill, Pakistani politician

References

External links
 IUB official website
 Official facebook page
 Official facebook page of Department of Soil Science
 Official facebook page of University College of Agriculture and Environmental Sciences

Public universities in Punjab, Pakistan
Universities and colleges in Bahawalpur
1925 establishments in India
Educational institutions established in 1925
Public universities and colleges in Punjab, Pakistan
Engineering universities and colleges in Pakistan
Islamia University of Bahawalpur
Bahawalpur